Ambo may refer to:

Places 
 Ambo, Kiribati
 Ambo Province, Huanuco Region, Peru
 Ambo District
 Ambo, Peru, capital of Ambo District
 Ambo Town, a town in Oromia Regional State, Ethiopia
 Ambo, Ethiopia, a capital of West Shewa Zone, Oromia Regional State, Ethiopia
 Wendens Ambo, village in Essex, England

Religion 
 Ambo (liturgy) or ambon, in Eastern orthodoxy the elevated area in front of the Iconostasis
 Ambo, a pulpit or lectern in a church sanctuary (the official term for Catholic pulpits)

Anthropology
 Ovambo language, or Ambo language
 Ovambo people, or Ambo people

Arts, entertainment, and media 
 "Ambo", an episode of the American television series Animal Kingdom
 Ambo, a music project of computer game designer Robyn Miller

Other uses
 Typhoon Ambo (disambiguation)
 Ambo, in Australia, a term for an ambulance
 Ambo, a variety of potato
 Ambo, an operation in Conway polyhedron notation
 Ambo Declaration, adopted at the Tarawa Climate Change Conference in November 2010
 Ambo Mineral Water or Ambo wuha, a carbonated bottled mineral water from the town of Ambo, Ethiopia
 AMBO pipeline, a planned oil pipeline to be built and operated by the US-registered Albanian Macedonian Bulgarian Oil Corporation